The following active airports serve the area around Ottawa, Ontario, Canada, lying under or adjacent to Ottawa's terminal control area:

Land airports

Scheduled commercial airline service

Other

Macdonald-Cartier handles all of the scheduled passenger service for Ottawa, in addition to a large amount of general aviation and some military traffic. The remaining airports serve almost exclusively general aviation. Macdonald-Cartier, Gatineau, Carp, Smiths Falls, and Arnprior have instrument approaches and winter maintenance for year-round, all-weather operations.

Water aerodromes

Heliports

See also 

 List of airports in the Bala, Ontario area
 List of airports in the Bracebridge area
 List of airports in the Fergus area
 List of airports in the London, Ontario area
 List of airports in the Parry Sound area
 List of airports in the Port Carling area
 List of airports in the Sault Ste. Marie, Ontario area
 List of airports in the Thunder Bay area
 List of airports in the Greater Toronto Area

References 

 
 
Airports
Airports
Airports
Airports
Airports
Airports
Airports
Airports
Buildings and structures in the United Counties of Stormont, Dundas and Glengarry
Airports
Airports
Ottawa
Ottawa